The following highways are numbered 318:

Canada
 Nova Scotia Route 318
 Prince Edward Island Route 318
 Saskatchewan Highway 318

China
 China National Highway 318

Costa Rica
 National Route 318

Japan
 Japan National Route 318

United States 
  Arkansas Highway 318
  Colorado State Highway 318
  Connecticut Route 318
 Florida:
  Florida State Road 318 (former)
  County Road 318, several roads in Florida
  Georgia State Route 318 (former)
  Indiana State Road 318 (former)
  Louisiana Highway 318
  Maryland Route 318
  Minnesota State Highway 318 (former)
  Montana Secondary Highway 318
  Nevada State Route 318
 New York:
  New York State Route 318
 County Route 318 (Wayne County, New York)
 Ohio State Route 318 (former)
  Pennsylvania Route 318
  Tennessee State Route 318
 Texas:
  Texas State Highway 318 (former)
  Farm to Market Road 318
  Utah State Route 318
  Virginia State Route 318
  Wyoming Highway 318

Other areas:
  Puerto Rico Highway 318
  U.S. Virgin Islands Highway 318